Subsonic ammunitions are ammunitions designed to operate at velocities below the speed of sound, which at standard conditions is  or Mach 1. This avoids the supersonic shockwave or "crack" of a supersonic bullet, which, particularly for suppressed firearms, influences the loudness of the shot.

Subsonic ammunition usually uses heavier bullets to retain as much energy as possible at the lower velocities.  Some subsonic ammunition is used in non-suppressed firearms to gain the advantages of heavier bullet weights.



Standard calibers

Subsonic versions of standard rounds
In this instance, heavier bullets are loaded in standard ammunition, which reduces muzzle velocity below the speed of sound.

For these ammunition loads, balancing bullet weight and velocity are required to ensure that the ammunition will still reliably cycle semi-automatic firearms.  Subsonic ammunition with normal bullet weights often fails to properly function in such firearms.

Inherently subsonic calibers
Some ammunition types were inherently designed with heavier, slower standard bullet weights and velocities. For example, the traditional American military standard .45 ACP ammunition load, of a 230 grain bullet at 850 feet per second, is naturally subsonic.

Specialized subsonic calibers
Alternatively, specialized firearms and ammunition may be used to optimize total subsonic ammunition effectiveness.  These are designed from the start as dedicated subsonic projectile systems.  Some examples include .300 Whisper / 300 AAC Blackout (7.62×35mm), .338 Whisper, 9×39mm, 12.7×55mm STs-130, .510 Whisper.

Use with suppressors

Combined with firearm sound suppressors, subsonic ammunition may significantly reduce sound levels compared to normal ammunition.  Specific reductions depend on the ammunition and suppressor.

The peak sound pressure levels of a Remington 700 .223 caliber bolt-action rifle firing high-velocity (supersonic) ammunition using a GEMTECH G5-5.56 suppressor.

The peak sound pressure levels of a Remington 700 .223 caliber bolt-action rifle firing low-velocity (subsonic) ammunition using a GEMTECH G5-5.56 suppressor.

Compared to the high-velocity (supersonic) unsuppressed condition, the combination of subsonic low-velocity ammunition and a firearm suppressor provided a reductions of 45, 38, 40, and 48 dB, peak sound pressure level at the muzzle, left, right ears and behind the shooter, respectively.

References

Ammunition